Yvetot is a commune in the Seine-Maritime department in the Normandy region in northern France. It is the capital of the Caux region.

History
The name Yvetot comes from the Germanic Yvo and the Old Norse -topt. Therefore, Yvetot means 'property of Yvo'.

The lords of Yvetot bore the title of king from the 15th until the middle of the 16th century, their petty monarchy being popularized in one of Béranger's songs. In 1592, Henry IV here defeated the troops of the Catholic League.

The town's prosperity was linked to strong commerce, developed as early as the 17th century, thanks to its fiscal statutes and to cotton spinning, which saw massive expansion after 1794.  In the 19th century, the town developed fabric production.
Until 1926, Yvetot had been chef-lieu of the old arrondissement of Yvetot, and a sub-prefecture. During this period of reorganisation, it lost its status of sub-prefecture.
In World War II, Yvetot was practically razed in 1940 by the Germans. Later, the 75th Division of the U.S. Army, 575th Signal Co., maintained its command post in the town from December 14–20, 1944, as it counterattacked against the German army.
After the war, Yvetot was rebuilt in a classical style and regained its importance in the middle of the 20th century.

Heraldry

Population

The Round Church and its stained-glass window

Having been destroyed during World War Two, Yvetot's main church of Saint-Pierre was rebuilt in a modernist style by architects Pierre Chirol, Robert Flavigny and Yves Marchand with a circular plan and opened in 1956.

The window's main colors are in shades of crimson, gold and blue. Meticulously assembled from a thousand pieces of glass, the stained-glass window portrays saints, with a wide section consecrated to the Normans of the diocese of Rouen. Either side of Christ are St. Peter (patron saint of Yvetot for a thousand years) and the apostles, including St. Valery (apostle of Vimeu and the Pays de Caux in the Pas de Calais in the 7th century), St. Saëns (an Irish monk and founder of an abbey in the valley of the Varenne), St. Ouen (who introduced monasteries to Rouen) and St. Wandrille of Normandy. The bishops of Rouen are also depicted. Among the bishops are the 7th century Archbishop Saint-Roman (in the process of strangling the "gargoyle", or swamp-dragon, that devastated Rouen), St Rémy, and St Hugues. Others represented in the stained-glass include the Virgin Mary and Joan of Arc shining in her armour.

Anecdotes
Yvetot's entry in the  Dictionnaire des idées reçues by Gustave Flaubert, reads: "YVETOT: Voir Yvetot et mourir! ['See Yvetot and die!'] (cf. Naples and Seville)".

It is in Yvetot that novelist Guy de Maupassant received his primary education; the town itself and its surrounding area, le Pays de Caux feature extensively in his works.

Twin towns – sister cities

Yvetot is twinned with:
 Hemmingen, Germany
 Kyjov, Czech Republic
 Lanark, Scotland, United Kingdom
 Murowana Goślina, Poland

See also
Communes of the Seine-Maritime department

References

External links

(All French language)
 Yvetot website
 Yvetot on the website of Quid

Communes of Seine-Maritime